Melvin Lloyd Parnell (June 13, 1922 – March 20, 2012) was a professional baseball pitcher who spent his entire Major League Baseball (MLB) career with the Boston Red Sox.

Playing career 
Parnell spent his entire ten-year career with the Boston Red Sox (1947–1956), compiling a 123–75 record with 732 strikeouts, a 3.50 earned run average, 113 complete games, 20 shutouts, and  innings pitched in 289 games (232 as a starter). He has the third-highest career winning percentage for a left-hander in Fenway Park (minimum of more than 25 decisions), at 71–30 (.703).

Parnell was a better than average hitting pitcher, posting a .198 batting average (132-for-668) with 52 runs, 1 home run, 50 RBI and 29 bases on balls. Defensively, he was better than average, recording a .971 fielding percentage which was 13 points higher than the league average at his position.

Parnell enjoyed his best season in 1949 when he went 25–7, leading the league in wins, complete games (27) and innings, and finished second with a 2.77 ERA. He was the starting pitcher for the American League in that year's All-Star Game and was selected again in 1951.

After two 18-win seasons in 1950 and 1951, and a 12–12 record in 1952, Parnell went 21–8 in 1953 with a 3.06 ERA and a career-high 136 strikeouts. On July 14, 1956, he no-hit the Chicago White Sox, 4–0, at Fenway Park. The no-hitter was the first for a Red Sox pitcher since Howard Ehmke in 1923, though this would prove the final highlight of Parnell's career, which would come to a premature end after the 1956 season, due to a torn muscle in his pitching arm.  It would take 52 years until another Red Sox lefty would throw a no-hitter, a feat accomplished by Jon Lester in 2008.

Parnell still holds the Red Sox career mark for left-handed pitchers in games started, innings and victories.

Parnell once said the southpaw's enemy at Fenway Park was the smallness of the foul territory, not the wall. It's been said that following a victory in Fenway Park during which Johnny Pesky hit the deciding home run near the right field foul pole, Parnell named it the "Pesky Pole" or Pesky's Pole. Research, however, shows that Pesky hit just one home run in a game pitched by Parnell, a two-run shot in the first inning of a game against Detroit played on June 11, 1950. The game was eventually won by the visiting Tigers in the 14th inning on a three-run shot by Tigers right fielder Vic Wertz, as Parnell earned a no-decision that day.

Post-playing career
After his playing career, Parnell managed the New Orleans Pelicans of the Class AA Southern Association in 1959 and a series of Red Sox farm clubs from 1961 to 1963.

Parnell was a member of Boston's radio and television announcing crew from 1965 to 1968 and the Chicago White Sox' TV crew in 1969. He called the last out of the final regular season game of the 1967 Red Sox "Impossible Dream" season on WHDH-TV:
"Little soft pop-up...Petrocelli will take it...he does!  The ball game is over!  The Red Sox win it!  And what a mob on this field!  They're coming out of the stands from all over!"

Parnell was mentioned in the 1981 Terry Cashman song "Talkin' Baseball".

Parnell was selected to the Boston Red Sox Hall of Fame in 1997. He thereafter resided in New Orleans until his death in 2012 following a long battle with cancer.

See also
List of Major League Baseball players who spent their entire career with one franchise

References

External links

1922 births
2012 deaths
American League All-Stars
American League wins champions
Baseball players from New Orleans
Boston Red Sox announcers
Boston Red Sox players
Deaths from cancer in Louisiana
Canton Terriers players
Centreville Red Sox players
Chicago White Sox announcers
Louisville Colonels (minor league) players
Major League Baseball broadcasters
Major League Baseball pitchers
Minor league baseball managers
Scranton Red Sox players
Tulane Green Wave baseball coaches